Colin James Loader (10 March 1931 – 19 June 2021) was a New Zealand rugby union player who represented the All Blacks between 1953 and 1954.

Born in Dannevirke in 1931, Loader was educated at Hutt Valley High School, where he was a member of the 1st XV between 1948 and 1950. He first represented Wellington from the University club, but switched to the Hutt club in 1952.

A second five-eighth and centre three-quarter, Loader was selected for the 1953–54 All Black tour to the British Isles, France and North America. He played 16 matches on the tour, including four test matches, scoring three tries in all. He made his international debut in Dublin against Ireland on 9 January 1954. He played all four of his test matches at the centre three-quarter position. He did not play for the All Blacks again and retired from rugby at the end of the 1955 season. He later coached at the Hutt club.

Loader died in Dunedin on 19 June 2021.

References

1931 births
2021 deaths
New Zealand international rugby union players
New Zealand rugby union coaches
New Zealand rugby union players
People educated at Hutt Valley High School
Rugby union centres
Rugby union players from Dannevirke
Wellington rugby union players